Reformer Athletic Club was an Argentine sports club based in the city of Campana, Buenos Aires. Founded by British-origin citizens, Reformer was mostly known for its football squad, which played in Primera División during the first years of football in Argentina.

History

Reformer Athletic Club was founded by British-origin employees of the Smithfield meatpacking plant placed in the city of Campana, in Buenos Aires Province.  Apart from football, several sports were practised at the club, such as athletics, bowls, cricket and tennis. Reformer is widely considered the pioneer of the sports clubs in Campana.

There are no records about the exact date of establishment of Reformer A.C., although it is believed that it was in 1903, shortly prior to the club registered a football squad with the Argentine Football Association to play the 1905 Primera División championship. Ernest Cunningham was not only the meatpacking plant manager but the football team captain.

In its first season in official tournaments, Reformer made a poor campaign, finishing the season with 60 goals conceded in 12 matches played.

In 1909 Reformer was relegated (along with Lomas), both becoming the first teams in the history of Primera División to be relegated under the promotion and relegation system. Reformer played the Segunda División championship until 1910 when the team was dissolved.

References

r
r
r